Reginald Jerome Sanders (September 9, 1949 in Birmingham, Alabama – January 27, 2002),  was a Major League Baseball player. He played 26 games, mostly at first base, for the Detroit Tigers in 1974. He hit a home run (off Catfish Hunter) in his first major league at bat.

Sanders was traded from the Oakland Athletics to the Tigers for Mike Kilkenny and cash on May 9, 1972. He was dealt from the Tigers to the Atlanta Braves for Jack Pierce in an exchange of minor-league first basemen on March 30, 1975. He was selected by the Chicago White Sox from the Braves in the Rule 5 draft on December 5, 1977.

Sanders died on January 27, 2002.

See also
List of Major League Baseball players with a home run in their first major league at bat

References

External links

1949 births
2002 deaths
African-American baseball players
Alacranes de Durango players
American expatriate baseball players in Mexico
Baseball players from Birmingham, Alabama
Birmingham A's players
Burlington Bees players
Charlotte O's players
Detroit Tigers players
Evansville Triplets players
Iowa Oaks players
Lodi Crushers players
Major League Baseball first basemen
Montgomery Rebels players
Richmond Braves players
Toledo Mud Hens players
20th-century African-American sportspeople
21st-century African-American people
Venice High School (Los Angeles) alumni